The Austrian Alpine Club has about 573,000 members in 196 sections and is the largest mountaineering organisation in Austria. It is responsible for the upkeep of over 234 alpine huts in Austria and neighbouring countries. It also maintains over 26,000 kilometres of footpaths, and produces detailed maps of key mountain areas within Austria. Much of this work is done by the association's 22,000 volunteers. The association has a museum in Innsbruck dedicated to the history of alpinism. It also has sections in Belgium and the United Kingdom, and a group in Poland.

See also 
 South Tyrol Alpine Club  (Alpenverein Südtirol, AVS)
 German Alpine Club  (Deutscher Alpenverein, DAV)

References

External links 
  OeAV (Austrian Alpine Association) 
 Austrian Alpine Club(UK) - OeAV Sektion Britannia 
 Alpenverein Polska (Ortsgruppe of OeAV Sektion Austria) 
 Alpenverein Slovakia (Ortsgruppe of OeAV Sektion Austria) 

Sports organisations of Austria
Tourism in Austria
Climbing organizations
Hiking organizations
1862 establishments in the Austrian Empire
Alpine clubs
Sports clubs established in 1862
Mountaineering in Austria
Hiking governing bodies